The 2016 Telkom Knockout was the 35th edition of the Telkom Knockout, a South African cup competition comprising the 16 teams in the Premier Soccer League. It took place between October and December 2016. It was won by Cape Town City - the club's first trophy, six months after the club's creation.

Results

First round

Quarter-finals

Semi-finals

Final

Prize money

References 

Telkom Knockout